Tasher Desh (English: The Land of Cards) is a 2012 Bengali fantasy film directed by Q. The film has been described as a "trippy adaptation"  of the 1933 Rabindrath Tagore play by Indian media. It begins with a nihilist playwright searching where the play, 'Tasher Desh' by Rabindranath Tagore is being played. He goes to major play theatres in Kolkata like The Academy of Fine Arts but no one has a show of Tasher Desh in the near time. He finally writes his own adapted script of the play by Tagore and completely immerses himself into it. Most of the dialogues and all the songs in the film are from the original play by Tagore while director Q is picturising himself as the playwright. It features Soumyak Kanti De Biswas, Anubrata Basu, Tillotama Shome, Rii, Joyraj Bhattacharjee, Tinu Verghese, and Immaduddin Shah in the lead roles. Tasher Desh made its international premiere on 11 November 2012 at the 7th Rome International Film Festival. The film had its release in India on 23 August 2013.

Plot
The story of a prince who escapes his destiny, the prison of his mind. He lands on a fascist island and incites women to revolt. A psychedelic fantasy about destiny and humanity, social control and Utopian revolution.

Cast
 Tillotama Shome as Queen
 Imaad Shah as Ruiton
 Anubrata Basu as Friend
 Rii Sen as Horotoni / Widow
 Maya Tideman as Tekkani
 Soumyak Kanti De Biswas as Prince
 Joyraj Bhattacharjee  as Storyteller / Tash King
 Tinu Verghese as Oracle

Soundtrack

"Ami Phul Tulite Elem" - Anusheh Anadil
"Amar Mon Bole Chai" - Qaushiq Mukherjee
"Amra Nuton Jouboneri" - Neel Adhikari
"Bnadh Bhenge Dao" - Qaushiq Mukherjee, Tanaji, Neel, Damini, Kamalika
"Bolo Shokhi Bolo" - Sahana Bajpaie
"Cholo Niyom Mote" - Qaushiq Mukherjee, Tanaji, Neel, Damini, Kamalika
"Elem Notun Deshe" - Qaushiq Mukherjee
"Ghorete Bhromor Elo" - Anusheh Anadil
"Gopono Kothati" - Susheela Raman, Qaushiq Mukherjee
"Hey Nobina" - Qaushiq Mukherjee
"Ichhe Ichhe" - Qaushiq Mukherjee, Neel, Damini, Kamalika
"Jaboi" - Qaushiq Mukherjee
"Khara Bayu Boye Bege" - Qaushiq Mukherjee, Neel, Damini, Kamalika
"Ogo Shanto" - Qaushiq Mukherjee
"Tash Anthem" - Qaushiq Mukherjee, Tanaji, Neel, Damini, Kamalika
"Tolon Namon" - Qaushiq Mukherjee, Tanaji, Neel, Damini, Kamalika
"Tomar Payer Tolaye" - Qaushiq Mukherjee
"Utol Hawa" - Anusheh Anadil

References

External links
 
 http://www.filmscoop.it/cgi-bin/recensioni/ilregnodellecarte.asp

2012 films
Bengali-language Indian films
2010s Bengali-language films
2012 fantasy films
Films shot in Sri Lanka
Films shot in India
Films based on works by Rabindranath Tagore
Indian films based on plays
Indian fantasy films
Films directed by Qaushiq Mukherjee